The 2011 Taiwan Series was played by Uni-President 7-Eleven Lions and Lamigo Monkeys, winners of the first and second half-seasons. The Lions won the title of 2011 Taiwan Series four games to one and will represent Taiwan in the 2011 Asia Series.

Participants
Uni-President 7-Eleven Lions - Winner of the first half-season.
Lamigo Monkeys - Winner of the second half-season.
The Lions and the Monkeys played each other in 40 regular season games, and the Monkeys had the upper hand with 21 wins, 18 losses, and one tied game. The two teams also played each other in the 2006 and 2007 Taiwan Series; the Monkeys defeated the Lions in 2006, but the Lions claimed the title in 2007.

Rules
All regular season rules apply with the following exceptions:
 Each team is allowed to register 28 players on its active roster.
 No tied games.
 Two outfield umpires are added to the games.

Summaries

Game 1
October 15, 2011 at Taoyuan International Baseball Stadium, Taoyuan County

Game 2
October 16, 2011 at Taoyuan International Baseball Stadium, Taoyuan County

Game 3
October 18, 2011 at Tainan Municipal Baseball Stadium, Tainan City

Game 4
October 19, 2011 at Tainan Municipal Baseball Stadium, Tainan City

Game 5
October 20, 2011 at Tainan Municipal Baseball Stadium, Tainan City

Taiwan Series
Chinese Professional Baseball League Playoffs, 2009
Taiwan